This Morning may refer to:

 This Morning (TV programme), a British daytime television programme
 This Morning (radio program), a Canadian radio show which aired from 1997 to 2002 
 CBS This Morning, an American morning show, successor and predecessor to The Early Show
 CNN This Morning, an American morning show
 "This Morning", a song by The Cure from The Cure
 "This Morning", a song by Irish band Picture This

See also
 This Morning with Richard Not Judy, a British comedy television programme